Kamal Kumbhar is an Indian social entrepreneur, “serial entrepreneur”. She is the founder of Kamal Poultry and Ekta Producer Company.

Early life  
Kamal Kumbhar was born in Osmanabad, Maharashtra to a daily-wage labourer. She lived in poverty and grew up without access to education. She married at a young age and after that failed, she was financially vulnerable.

Career 
Kumbhar joined women's self-help groups and started a small business selling bangles from an investment of 500 INR. Two years later, she was leading a women's federation in Maharashtra.

She started Kamal Poultry and Ekta Producer Company in 1998 with no knowledge of business or marketing, with an investment of Rs 2,000. The company sells about Rs 1 lakh every month. She has mentored more than 5,000 women from her state to set up similar enterprises and become self-sufficient.

In 2012, she became a clean energy entrepreneur and lit up over 3000 homes with solar-powered devices, after training as an “Energy Sakhi” in SSP ’s “women in clean energy program”, which trained over 1100 women across Maharashtra and Bihar. She owns six business ventures earning the moniker “serial entrepreneur”. She owns a range of agriculture-allied businesses.

Awards 
 CII Foundation's Woman Exemplar award from President Pranab Mukherjee
 Women Transforming India Award, 2017, organized by United Nations and NITI Aayog.

References

21st-century Indian businesswomen
21st-century Indian businesspeople
Living people
Year of birth missing (living people)